The white-bellied redstart (Luscinia phaenicuroides) is a species of bird of the family Muscicapidae. It is found in Bhutan, China, India, Laos, Myanmar, Nepal, Pakistan, Thailand, and Vietnam, where its natural habitat is temperate forests.

The white-bellied redstart was previously the only species in the genus Hodgsonius. A large molecular phylogenetic study published in 2010 found that the white-bellied redstart formed part of a clade that included the common nightingale. The species was therefore moved to Luscinia.

Gallery

References

white-bellied redstart
Birds of China
Birds of the Himalayas
Birds of Tibet
Birds of Yunnan
white-bellied redstart
white-bellied redstart
white-bellied redstart
Taxonomy articles created by Polbot
Taxobox binomials not recognized by IUCN